Greg Koch (born 1966) is an American guitarist from Wauwatosa, Wisconsin. Koch grew up in the Milwaukee area and began playing guitar at the age of 12. He was influenced by the guitarist and singer-songwriter Jimi Hendrix. In April 2012 Fender Musical Instruments Corporation named Koch one of the top 10 unsung guitarists.

Early life
Koch was the youngest of seven children. He attended college for jazz performance at the University of Wisconsin-Stevens Point.

Personal life
Koch met his wife Sarah while he was attending college and together they have four children, two boys and two girls. Koch and his wife have been married since 1993. Their oldest son (Dylan Koch) is the drummer for Koch's band, The Koch Marshall Trio. Koch stands 6 feet 7 inches tall.

Career
Koch won first place in the 1989 Bluesbreaker Guitar Showdown judged by singer/guitar player Buddy Guy. Koch has also played with Joe Bonamassa. Greg Koch is currently a Martin Guitar clinician. In addition to playing guitar, Koch has authored many books on various guitar methods and styles.

Greg Koch and the Tone Controls 
The group was formed as a trio that included guitar, bass, and drums. The original band members include Journeyman drummer and vocalist Gary Koehler, bass and vocals Kevin Mushel, and Koch on six-string guitar and vocals. Other members of the band include John Calarco on drums and Tom Goode on bass.

Koch and the Tone Controls won five Wisconsin Area Music Awards for Blues Artist of the Year (1993, 1995, 1996, 1997, and 1998).

Greg Koch and Other Bad Men 
Koch recorded a live album (Greg Koch and Other Bad Men Live on the Radio) with bass player Roscoe Beck and vocalist Malford Milligan and various musicians on the drums: John Calarco and Tom Brechtlein.

The Koch Marshall Trio 

The Koch Marshall Trio is the most successful band that Koch has assembled. The band has been well received and reviewed. In previous Koch bands there have been some vocals. The Koch Marshall Trio has not used a singer.

The Koch Marshall Trio is an instrumental organ/guitar trio established by Koch in 2017. The Trio includes Koch's son Dylan Koch on drums, Toby Lee Marshall on Hammond organ and Koch on guitar. The Koch Marshall Trio has signed a contract with the Mascot Label Group. They released their debut studio album, Toby Arrives, on February 23, 2018.

The Koch Marshall Trio's debut album "Toby Arrives" was submitted for a Grammy nomination 2018.

Solo work
Koch works as a clinician for Fishman and Martin. In addition, Koch has his own signature amplifier ‘The Greg’, manufactured by the Koch Amplifier company. Koch also has a signature guitar which was released in 2019 by Reverend Guitars, named the ‘Greg Koch Signature Gristlemaster’. The guitar colors were given somewhat humorous names like: Kochwork Orange, and Blucifer.

Since 2011, Koch has made monthly promotional videos for Wildwood Guitars in Colorado. He has made approximately 4000 videos which have over 50 million views.

Koch released an acoustic album in December 2019. The 38-minute album has 14 songs.

In 2019 Koch signed with True Grit Talent Agency.

Style
Koch has developed his own style of chicken picking on the guitar and has taught his method, referred to as hybrid picking. Koch uses a guitar pick held with the index finger and thumb of his right hand to pick the bass notes; he uses his other three fingers to pick the treble strings.

Koch has termed his style of playing "gristle" and has been called the "Gristle King". Gristle is usually instrumental, guitar-driven music that leads to a crescendo of trading solos.

Koch's ability on the guitar has been admired by other guitarists. When guitar pioneer Les Paul had his 100th birthday celebration Koch was invited to play. Joe Bonamassa and Steve Vai praised his mastery over guitar and versatility in style.

Musical equipment

Guitars
 1953 Fender Telecaster
 Wildwood Spec #10 Fender Telecaster with Fishman Fluence pickups
 Fender Stratocaster
  Fender Custom Shop Greg Koch GSK Stratocaster
 Reverend Guitars Greg Koch Signature Gristlemaster

Accessories
 Fishman Fluence Signature Series Greg Koch Gristle-Tone™ Pickups
 T Jauernig Electronics, Greg Koch The Gristle King V3 effect pedal

Amplifiers
 Koch Amplifier signature amp "The Greg"

Books authored by Koch
 Hal Leonard Guitar Method Book 1: Book/CD Pack By will Schmid and Greg Koch January 1995
 Hal Leonard Guitar Method - Blues Guitar by Greg Koch January 2002
 Hal Leonard Guitar Method, Complete Edition: Books 1, 2 and 3 By Will Schmid and Greg Koch May 2002
 Rhythm Riffs: Over 200 Riffs in All Styles Hal Leonard Guitar Method (Hal Leonard Guitar Method (Songbooks)) by Greg Koch May 2003
 Lead Licks: Over 200 Licks in All Styles Hal Leonard Guitar Method (Hal Leonard Guitar Method (Songbooks)) by Greg Koch January 2003
 Hal Leonard Country Guitar Method (Hal Leonard Guitar Method) by Greg Koch January 2004
 Hal Leonard Guitar Method Book 2: Spanish Language Book Only (Spanish Edition) by Will Schmid and Greg Koch December 2004
 Greg Koch (Guitar Play-Along, Vol. 28 by Greg Koch February 2005
 Hal Leonard Metodo Para Guitarra - Libro 2: Spanish Edition Book/CD Pack by Will Schmid and Greg Koch January 2005
 Hal Leonard Guitar Method, Book 1 - Left-Handed Edition (Hal Leonard Guitar Method Books) by Greg Koch August 2009
 Guitar Gumbo: Savory Licks, Tips & Quips for Serious Players by Greg Koch June 2012
 Slide Guitar In Standard Tuning by Greg Koch March 2016
 Hal Leonard Guitar Method - Book 1, Deluxe Beginner Edition: Includes Audio & Video on Discs and Online Plus Guitar Chord Poster by will Schmid and Greg Koch January 2016
 Guitar Clues: Operation Pentatonic by Greg Koch 2017
 Brave New Blues Guitar: Classic Styles, Techniques & Licks Reimagined with a Modern Feel by Greg Koch May 2018

Discography
 Greg Koch and the Tone Controls (1993)
 Double the Gristle (1997)
 Defenestrator (1998)
 The Grip (2001)
 Radio Free Gristle (2003)
 13 X 12 (2003)
 4 Days in the South (2005)
 Mixed Feelings (2005)
 Live on the Radio (Greg Koch and Other Bad Men) (2007)
 Nation Sack - Greg Koch and Malford Milligan
 From the Attic - Greg Koch Trio (2010)
 Strat's Got Your Tongue (2012)
 Plays Well with Others (2013)
 Vivid Gristle (Greg Koch and the Tone Controls) (2015)
 Unrepentant (2017)
 Toby Arrives (Koch Marshall Trio) (2018)
 Acoustic Gristle Soup (2019)
 From the Up'Nuh (Koch Marshall Trio) (2021)

DVDs
 Guitar Gristle (2004)
 Guitar Signature Licks: Blues With Greg Koch (2004)
 Guitar Licks: Lead Lines & Phrases In The Style Of 25 Great Guitarists (2009)
 Vivid Gristle Greg Koch and the Tone Controls (2015)

Other Contributions
 Xpensive Dogs - Xpensive Dogs/Wat Tyler [Split CD] Greg Koch: Group Member, Guitar (1996)
 Sigmund Snopek III - Beer - Greg Koch: guitar (1998)
 Willy Porter Falling Forward (1999)
 Discover Wisconsin Music: Art-Of-The-State - Track 1 Ila Rose (2000)
 Various Artists - Where Blues Meets Rock, Vol. 5 - Track 10 Ain't Got Problems (2003)
 Xpensive Dogs - Dog Eat Dog (2004)
 Lisa Lauren - It Is What It Is Greg Koch: Guitar, Guitar (Electric), Dobro (2004)
 Joy Jackson  - To Be With You Greg Koch: Audio Production, Drums, Engineer, Mixing, Producer, backing vocals (2004)
 Alaria Taylor - Unfinished Business Greg Koch: slide guitar (2004)
 Various Artists - Acoustic Christmas Favored Nations - Track 5 God Rest Ye Merry Gentlemen (2004)
 Various Artists - Where Blues Meets Rock, Vol. 6. Track 4 Bored to Tears (2005)
 Roger Powell - Fossil Poets - Greg Koch: Bass, Effects, Guitar (2006)
 Lisa Lauren - Lisa Lauren Loves the Beatles - Greg Koch: guitar, Dobro (2006)
 Blues Power - Track 13 Change Is Gonna Come (2009)
 Ray Riendeau - Atmospheres - Track 4 Alias (2010)
 Various Artists - Pepper Shakers: Pepper Cake Label Sampler 3 Greg Koch Trio: Agree To Disagree (2011)
 Various Artists - Grooveyard Records: Best of, Vol. One (The Sound of Guitar Rock) Track 15 Foolish Mortals (2012)
 Carmen Grillo - A Different World - Track 1 Come and Gone (2013)
 John Sieger - A Walk in the Park - Greg Koch: Composer, Featured Artist (2013)
 Various Artists - Blues Essentials [Pepper Cake] Disc 2 track 7, Disc 3 track 13, Disc 5 track 6 (2014)
 Various Artists - Blues from a Smoky Bar, Vol. 2 Greg Koch: Track 3 Sleep Tight (2015)

References 

1966 births
Living people
American male guitarists
University of Wisconsin–Stevens Point alumni
American blues singers
Progressive rock guitarists
Guitarists from Wisconsin
Musicians from Milwaukee
People from Wauwatosa, Wisconsin
American blues guitarists
20th-century American guitarists
21st-century American male singers
21st-century American singers
21st-century American guitarists
American country musicians
Favored Nations artists
Provogue Records artists